If You're Ever in Texas is an album by Freddy Fender that was released in 1976.

Track listing 
"Don't Do It Darling"
"It's All in the Game"
"San Antonio Lady"
"What a Difference a Day Made"
"Living It Down"
"Pass Me By (If You're Only Passing Through)"
"If You're Ever in Texas"
"Sometimes"
"Just One Time"
"It's Too Late" (Chuck Willis)
50's Medley: "Donna" / "For Sentimental Reasons" / "You're Mine" / "Cherry Pie" / "Sincerely" / "Earth Angel" / "Angel Baby" / "Daddy's Home"

Personnel 
Freddie Fender - guitar, vocals
Bill Ham - guitar
Evan Arredondo, Ira Wilkes, Keith Grimwood - bass
Larry White - steel guitar
"Uncle" Micky Moody - steel guitar
"Fiddlin'" Frenchie Bourke - fiddle
Randy Lynch, Dahrell Norriss - drums
Warren Ham - flute
Bruce Ewen - keyboards
The Sugar Sweets, Tracey Balin - background vocals
Betty Rubin, Kim Brady, Margaret Ruttenberg, Mary Fulgham - strings

References 

Freddy Fender albums
1976 albums
Dot Records albums